Talvandi or Talwandi , is a town and Union Council of Kasur District in the Punjab province of Pakistan. It is part of Chunian Tehsil located at 30°53'60N 74°7'60E and has an altitude of 175 metres (577 feet).

References

Kasur District